The Hungarian football champions are the winners of the highest league in Hungarian football, which is currently the Nemzeti Bajnokság I.

Nemzeti Bajnokság (1901–present)

Notes:
In the brackets are shown the number of titles won.
Note 1: Győr finished in the top three of the 2011–12 Hungarian National Championship I, but they will not be eligible to enter either the 2012–13 UEFA Champions League or Europa League due to having been suspended from participating in UEFA competitions for the first season they qualify between the 2011–12 and 2013–14 seasons in relation to club licensing violations. As a result, the fourth-placed team of the league will take one of Hungary's Europa League places in the first qualifying round.
Note 2: On 28 January 2011, Nikolić  obtained Hungarian citizenship. András Palkovics, mayor of Székesfehérvár said that "We know about him that he knows the country, speaks the language since he has big plans with Videoton this year". Nikolić said that "I knew that it is not easy to obtain Hungarian citizenship but I hoped that due to the fact that my mother is Hungarian it would be easier but it turned out to be a bit more difficult".

Performances

Performances by club

Fourteen clubs have been champions among which Nagyvárad have no longer been member of the Hungarian League since the end of World War II.

Notes:
† Teams dissolved.
‡ After 1946 played in the Romanian Liga I, but was dissolved in 1963.
 Újpest and Csepel became a district of Budapest on 1 January 1950.
The Bold teams are currently playing in the 2021–22 season of the Hungarian League.

See also
 Nemzeti Bajnokság I
 Nemzeti Bajnokság II
 Nemzeti Bajnokság III

References

External links
Hungary - List of Champions, RSSSF.com

Hungary
Nemzeti Bajnokság I
Hungarian football club statistics